Purple Mountain is a  mountain in the southwest portion of the U.S. state of Oregon. It is one of many densely forested peaks located in the Oregon Coast Range.

Mountains of the Oregon Coast Range
Rogue River-Siskiyou National Forest
Mountains of Curry County, Oregon